WIAS may refer to:

 Weierstrass Institute, formally known as the Weierstrass Institute for Applied Analysis and Stochastics
 West Indies Associated States
 Windhoek Show, formally known as the Windhoek Industrial and Agricultural Show

See also
 WIA (disambiguation)